Gilmer is a city in, and the county seat of, Upshur County, Texas. It is best known for being the home of the East Texas Yamboree and the birthplace of popular music singers Don Henley of the Eagles band and Johnny Mathis, as well as blues musician Freddie King. Its population was 4,843 at the 2020 census.

History

Founded in 1846, the city's namesake is former United States Secretary of the Navy, Thomas Walker Gilmer. Gilmer is located on the Old Cherokee Trace, a trail used by the Cherokee Indians in their travels. To this day, arrowheads and other Native American artifacts can be found with little to no digging. Sam Houston, when he lived with the Cherokee, traveled the trace through here. The location of Gilmer was determined by a flood on Little Cypress Creek. First located near the creek, residents decided to change locations because of frequent floods.

Geography 

Gilmer is located at 32°43'57" North, 94°56'49" West (32.732387, –94.946980).

According to the United States Census Bureau, the city has a total area of 4.6 mi2 (12.0 km2), all of it land.

Four miles west of Gilmer is Lake Gilmer, which opened September 29, 2001.

Gilmer is part of a larger area known as the East Texas Piney Woods.

Demographics 

As of the 2020 United States census, 4,843 people, 1,778 households, and 987 families were residing in the city.

As of the census of 2000, 4,799 people, 1,926 households, and 1,300 families resided in the city. The population density was 1,038.5 people per square mile (401.1/km). The 2,214 housing units averaged 479.1 per mi2 (185.0/km). The racial makeup of the city was 75.91% White, 20.23% African American, 0.35% Native American, 0.08% Asian, 0.02% Pacific Islander, 1.90% from other races, and 1.50% from two or more races. Hispanics or Latinos of any race were 4.42% of the population.

Of the 1,926 households, 30.1% had children under 18 living with them, 46.2% were married couples living together, 17.7% had a female householder with no husband present, and 32.5% were not families. About 29.9% of all households were made up of individuals, and 17.3% had someone living alone who was 65  or older. The average household size was 2.37, and the average family size was 2.93.

In the city, the population was distributed as 25.3% under 18, 7.8% from 18 to 24, 23.5% from 25 to 44, 21.6% from 45 to 64, and 21.8% who were 65 or older. The median age was 40 years. For every 100 females, there were 83.4 males. For every 100 females 18 and over, there were 76.3 males.

The median income for a household in the city was $28,487, and for a family was $39,688. Males had a median income of $32,437 versus $17,910 for females. The per capita income for the city was $16,823. About 15.9% of families and 19.1% of the population were below the poverty line, including 26.5% of those under the age of 18 and 21.0% of those 65 and older.

Notable people

Music 
 Don Henley, Grammy Award-winning singer-songwriter and founding member of the Eagles
 Freddie King, guitarist and singer in Blues Hall of Fame and Rock and Roll Hall of Fame
 Johnny Mathis, multiple platinum-selling popular music and standards singer; Grammy Lifetime Achievement Award
 Jason Sellers, country music singer-songwriter
 Michelle Shocked, folk singer-songwriter

Sports 
Kris Boyd, American football defensive back for the Minnesota Vikings
 Curtis Brown, former defensive back for the Pittsburgh Steelers 
 Manuel Johnson, former wide receiver for the Dallas Cowboys
 G. J. Kinne, NFL and Canadian Football League quarterback
 Kenny Pettway, linebacker for the Edmonton Eskimos
 David Snow, former offensive lineman for the Buffalo Bills and Pittsburgh Steelers
Jeff Traylor, head football coach UTSA
Gus Johnson, former NFL running back 
Louis Wright, former four-time first-team All-Pro cornerback for the Denver Broncos

Other 

 David Abner, an African-American Republican state representative from 1874 to 1875, he was brought to Upshur County as a slave from Selma, Alabama.
 Charles F. Baird, a former justice of the Texas Court of Criminal Appeals and former judge, Travis County District Court, he is the only judge in Texas history to preside over the exoneration of a deceased individual; he was longtime criminal-justice reform advocate.
 Robert N. McClelland was a surgeon for John F. Kennedy at Parkland Hospital in Dallas on the day of his assassination.
 Robert L. Stephens, record-setting test pilot
 Harold Moss, the first African-American mayor of Tacoma, Washington
 Thomas F. Proctor, a trainer of Thoroughbred racehorses, he won the 1994 edition of the Breeders’ Cup Distaff with One Dreamer.

In popular culture
 The Michelle Shocked song "Memories of East Texas" recalls her experiences growing up in Gilmer.

Education
Gilmer is served by the Gilmer Independent School District.

Climate
The climate in this area is characterized by hot, humid summers and generally mild to cool winters. According to the Köppen climate classification, Gilmer has a humid subtropical climate, Cfa on climate maps.

Notes

References

External links

 City of Gilmer official website.
 East Texas Yamboree

Cities in Texas
Cities in Upshur County, Texas
County seats in Texas
Longview metropolitan area, Texas